Ectoedemia nuristanica is a moth of the family Nepticulidae. It is only known from Nuristan in eastern Afghanistan.

The wingspan is 6.4–7 mm. Adults have been caught in July.

It is thought that, unlike most other Nepticulidae species, the larvae mine the bark of their host, rather than the leaves. The host plant is unknown, but specimens were taken at light in mountains with extensive woods of Quercus baloot.

External links
A Taxonomic Revision Of The Western Palaearctic Species Of The Subgenera Zimmermannia Hering And Ectoedemia Busck s.str. (Lepidoptera, Nepticulidae), With Notes On Their Phylogeny

Nepticulidae
Moths of Asia
Moths described in 1985